This is a guide to the size of settlements in Warwickshire based on the data from the article on each town which in turn are taken from the 2001, 2011 and 2021 UK censuses. The population of Warwickshire in 2021 was officially estimated to be 596,773.

See also 
 Coventry

References

External links 
Census 2001 website

List of Warwickshire towns by population
Warwickshire towns
Towns